Events from the year 1985 in art.

Events
Charles Saatchi's collection opens to the public, arousing interest in Neo-expressionism.

Germano Celant publishes Arte Povekira: Storie e protagonisti.
Art gallerist Andrew Crispo  and the Solomon R. Guggenheim Museum are involved in a dispute over Constantin Brâncuși's 1912 sculpture "The Muse" which ends in the museum paying $2 million US for the artwork, at the time believed to be the most ever paid for a 20th century sculpture.

Awards
Archibald Prize: Guy Warren – Flugelman with Wingman
John Moores Painting Prize - Bruce McLean for "Oriental Garden Kyoto
Turner Prize – Howard Hodgkin
Shortlisted were: Terry Atkinson, Tony Cragg, Ian Hamilton Finlay, Milena Kalinovska and John Walker.

Works

Mai Dantsig – And the Saved World Remembers
Robyn Denny – Coloured lines at Embankment tube station in London, England
Christo and Jeanne Claude - "The Pont Neuf Wrapped" at the Pont Neuf in Paris, France
Thomas Morandi – Yankee Champion (sculpture, Portland, Oregon)
Odd Nerdrum – The Cloud (Skyen)
George Rickey – Double L Excentric Gyratory (sculpture)
Sally Robinson (Australian) – Kakadu (screen print)
Wayne Thiebaud – Sunset Streets
Andy Warhol – Reigning Queens series

Births
September 24 – Eric Adjetey Anang, Ghanaian sculptor
date unknown
 Lawrence Abu Hamdan, Jordanian-born artist
 Helen Marten, English sculptor and installation artist

Deaths
8 January – Grace Morley, American-born curator (b. 1900)
18 January – Anwar Shemza, Pakistan-born British artist and writer (b. 1928)
7 March – Jessie Oonark, Canadian Inuit artist (b. 1906)
28 March – Marc Chagall, Russian-Belarusian-French painter (b. 1887).
21 April – Rudi Gernreich, Austrian American fashion designer (b. 1922).
11 May – Chester Gould, American cartoonist (b. 1900).
12 May – Jean Dubuffet, French painter and sculptor (b. 1901).
22 May – Wolfgang Reitherman, German-American animator (b. 1909).
26 July – Grace Albee, American printmaker (b. 1890).
21 August – David Olère, Polish-born Jewish French painter (b. 1902).
8 September – Ana Mendieta, Cuban American performance artist, sculptor, painter and video artist
28 September – André Kertész, Hungarian-born photographer (b. 1894).
17 November – Richard Amsel, American illustrator and graphic designer (b. 1947).
8 December – Paul Kelpe, German-born American painter (b. 1902).
Ovartaci, Danish outsider artist (b. 1894)
Antonio Rodríguez Luna, Spanish painter (b. 1910).

See also 
 1985 in fine arts of the Soviet Union

References

 
Years of the 20th century in art
1980s in art